Écoles Sans Frontières ("Schools Without Borders") is a French non-governmental organisation (NGO) with volunteers and offices throughout the world who endeavour to:

"defend the basic right to education in the respect of human dignity. To develop education and human resources for the underprivileged populations and to contribute to the safeguard of their culture of origin. To facilitate, by teaching, the search for durable solutions for the refugees".

The motto of the organisation is L'instruction, c'est l'espoir ("Education is hope").
ESF volunteers work to help underprivileged in refugee camps throughout South East Asia, Haiti and Guatemala.

See also 
 List of Without Borders organizations

External links 
 Overview of Organisation 

International educational organizations
Educational organizations based in France